Collins-Pope syndrome, also known as Dislocation of the hip-dysmorphism syndrome, is a rare autosomal dominant genetic disorder which is characterized by bilateral congenital hip dislocation, flattened mid-face, hypertelorism, epicanthus, puffy eyes, broad nasal bridge, carp-shaped mouth, and joint hypermobility. Additional findings include congenital heart defects, congenital knee dislocation, congenital inguinal hernia, and vesicoureteric reflux. It has been described in 4 members of a 2-generation family in the United Kingdom.

References 

Genetic diseases and disorders
Autosomal dominant disorders